Pawley may refer to:

 Andrew Pawley (born 1941), Australian linguist
 Bernard Pawley (1911–1981), Anglican priest
 Edward Pawley (1901–1988), American actor
 Howard Pawley (1934–2015), Canadian politician and professor
 William D. Pawley (1896–1977), American ambassador and businessman

See also 
 Pawley Nunataks, a line of four nunataks in Palmer Land, Antarctica
 Pawleys Island, South Carolina, a town in the United States
 Pauley (disambiguation)